The Airbus A318 is the smallest and least numerous variant airliner of the Airbus A320 family. Final assembly of the aircraft took place in Hamburg, Germany.
It is intended primarily for short-range service.

The aircraft shares a common type rating with all other Airbus A320 family variants, allowing pilots to fly all versions of the aircraft without the need for further training. It is the largest commercial aircraft certified by the European Aviation Safety Agency for steep approach operations, allowing flights at airports such as London City.

The A318 entered service in July 2003 with Frontier Airlines. Relative to other Airbus A320 family variants, it sold only small numbers with total orders for 80 aircraft placed, and the type no longer listed for sale. Air France was the largest operator of the Airbus A318. The type has zero accidents.

Development

Background 
The first member of the A320 aircraft family was the A320, which first flew on 22 February 1987 after the program was launched in March 1984. The family was soon extended to include the stretched A321 (first delivery 1994), the shortened A319 (first delivery 1996), and the further shortened A318 (first delivery 2003). The A320 family pioneered the use in commercial aircraft of digital fly-by-wire flight control systems, as well as side stick controls.

The Airbus A318 project had its origins in the collaboration among Chinese, Singaporean and European manufacturers. In May 1997, during the visit of French President Jacques Chirac to China, Aviation Industries of China (AVIC), Singapore Technologies Aerospace (STAe), Airbus and Alenia signed a framework agreement that outlined the development of aircraft in the 100-seat range. The AE31X, as it was tentatively dubbed, besides being a global industrial programme would have significantly deepened Sino-European commercial ties. With development costs estimated to be upwards of $2 billion, AVIC would have a 46 percent stake in the project, STAe 15 percent, and Airbus Industrie Asia 39 percent, the latter of which comprised Airbus and Alenia. Final assembly would have taken place in China.

The project never went past the exploratory phase. It comprised two clean-sheet designs – the AE316 and the AE317. The AE316 and AE317 would have seated a maximum of 105 and 125 passengers in five-abreast seating, respectively. Both would share a flight deck and fly-by-wire flight control system similar to that of the A320 family.

Market research conducted during 1997 revealed that airlines wanted a smaller aircraft in the 70-80-seat range. As the project proceeded, there were increasing disagreements between the Chinese side and Airbus. China wanted a larger aircraft than originally envisioned. In addition, there were difficulties arising out of negotiations about technology transfer and production workshare, and a weak business case. STAe, having previously expressed doubts about returns on the project, in 1998 withdrew from the project out of the failure between AIA and AVIC to reach an agreement; Airbus and AVIC would cancel the project in July that year. The A318 is believed to have emerged from the AE31X project though an Airbus-only project, named the A319M5 in March 1998, began before the AE31X cancellation.

Design phase 
The internal corporate designation, A319M5, was used as early as March 1998, as an A319 derivative with fuselage shortening of  ahead of the wing and  behind. The aircraft's production took advantage of laser welding, eliminating the necessity for heavy rivets and bolts.

During the design process, the A318 encountered several problems. The first one was the decline in demand for new aircraft following the September 11 attacks. Another was the new Pratt & Whitney turbofan engines, which burned more fuel than expected. By the time CFM International (CFM) had a more efficient engine ready for market, many A318 customers had already backed out, including Air China and British Airways. America West Airlines, which had selected the Pratt & Whitney engines, amended its A318 orders, opting instead for A319 or A320 aircraft. Trans World Airlines cancelled a significant order for fifty A318s after being acquired by American Airlines, which did not operate any A320 family aircraft at the time (although neither did TWA when the order was originally placed). While Airbus was hoping to market the A318 as a regional jet alternative, laws in both the U.S. and Europe have kept it in the same class as larger aircraft for calculating charges such as landing fees, limiting the type's market potential.

Launch customers Frontier Airlines and Air France took deliveries in 2003, with Frontier receiving its aircraft in July of that year. The list price of an A318 ranges from $56 to $62 million, and operating costs are between $2,500 and $3,000 for each flight hour.

Orders for the A318 have been relatively slow, but slightly better than for its direct competitor the Boeing 737-600. By 30 September 2017, Airbus had received 80 orders for this model compared to 69 for the 737-600. The sales pace has been influenced by the strong sales of the Bombardier CRJ900 and Embraer E-Jet family. The biggest A318 customers  were governments, executive and private jets (20), Air France (18), Avianca Holdings (15), lessor GE Capital Aviation Services (12) and Frontier Airlines (9).

Further developments 
On 10 November 2005 Airbus announced the A318 Elite. The Airbus A318 Elite is aimed at the medium-range market for flights of up to  range, with a choice of two cabin layouts seating up to 18 passengers, and powered by CFM engines. Comlux Aviation became the launch customer by ordering three A318 Elite aircraft.

In September 2010, Airbus confirmed that from 2013 the Airbus A318 would become available with Sharklets, wingtip devices which reduce lift-induced drag and improve efficiency through reduced fuel consumption.

Design 
The Airbus A318 is a small commercial, narrow-body (single-aisle) aircraft with a retractable tricycle landing gear and is powered by two wing pylon-mounted turbofan engines. Two suppliers provide turbofan engines for the A318, CFM International with the CFM56-5B engine and Pratt & Whitney with the PW6000 engine. It is a low-wing cantilever monoplane with a conventional tail unit having a single vertical stabilizer and rudder.

Overall, the A318 is over six metres shorter and around  lighter than the A320. To compensate for the reduced moment arm, it has a larger vertical stabiliser. While initial concepts depicted the aircraft with a Boeing 737-300-style dorsal fin extension, the final design incorporated a fin tip extension, making it  taller than the other A320 variants. Pilots who are trained on the other variants may fly the A318 with no further certification, since it features a common flight deck and the same type rating as its sister aircraft. The A318 is also referred to as the A318-100.

When equipped with CFM56-5B8/P engines, the A318 is available with a  MTOW. When equipped with CFM56-5B9/P engines, the A318 is available with a  MTOW. The lower MTOW enables it to operate regional routes economically while sacrificing range and the higher MTOW allows it to complement other members of the A320 family on marginal routes. The lighter weight of the A318 gives it an operating range 10% greater than the A320, allowing it to serve some routes that the A320 would be unable to: London – New York, Perth–Auckland and Singapore–Tokyo, for instance. Its main use for airlines, however, is on short, low-density hops between medium-sized cities.

Steep approach capability 

In March 2006, the European Aviation Safety Agency (EASA) certified a modified control software enhancement to the Airbus A318 designed to allow the aircraft to perform steep approaches. The aircraft is the largest commercial aircraft certified by EASA for steep approach operations. The software modifies the control laws of the aircraft when the steep approach function is selected by the crew, by automatically deploying some of the spoiler panels to provide additional drag when the aircraft is in the landing configuration. It also provides alternative aural alerts to the crew and modifies spoiler deployment automatically below  on landing. The A318 steep approach procedure allows the aircraft to perform approaches at descent angles of up to 5.5°, as opposed to the standard 3° for a normal approach.

A test flight was conducted in May 2006 to prove the aircraft's steep approach and short runway performance by landing at London City Airport, where such steep approaches are required. The test flight also confirmed the aircraft's compatibility with the limited maneuvering and parking space at that airport. Subsequently, in August 2009 Airbus delivered the first A318 with steep approach capability to British Airways, which began operating the route the following month as its Club World London City service, eventually having two such aircraft capable of flights between London City Airport and John F. Kennedy International Airport in New York. On the westbound leg from London, a stopover is necessary for refueling, which occurs at Shannon Airport, Ireland because weight restrictions are necessary in order to take off within the existing short runway length of London City Airport. On the eastbound leg from New York this limitation is not present and the aircraft can take all the fuel needed for the transatlantic route to London. As of November 2017, only one aircraft was serving the route, operated in a 32-seat all-business-class configuration. The second aircraft was retired on 31 July 2020, following the COVID-19 pandemic which deemed such type uneconomical.

Operational history 

Although final assembly of A320 family aircraft takes place in Toulouse, France; Hamburg, Germany; Tianjin, China; and Mobile, Alabama, USA, final assembly of the Airbus A318 was in Hamburg, Germany. The maiden flight of the Airbus A318 took place from Finkenwerder airfield in Hamburg on 15 January 2002. The first customer delivery was on 22 July 2003 to Frontier Airlines.
As of 30 September 2017, 67 A318s remained in service with five airlines, in addition to governments, executive and private jets and undisclosed operators. Most A318 aircraft retired from airline service have been scrapped due to the engine and components being more valuable than whole aircraft. Frontier Airlines, the launch customer that acquired A318 aircraft between 2003 and 2007, had retired their last A318 by 2013.

Operators 

, Airbus A318 operators are:

Orders and deliveries 

Data through end of September 2017. Updated 7 October 2017.

Specifications

Engines

See also

References 
Footnotes

References

Bibliography
 "World Airliner Census". Flight International, Volume 184, Number 5403, 13–19 August 2013, pp. 40–58.

External links 

 Official Airbus website of the A320 aircraft family

A318
2000s international airliners
Twinjets
Airbus A320 family